Archangels are the highest rank of angel.

Archangel or Arkangel may also refer to:

Places
 Archangel (city) or Arkhangelsk, Russia
 Archangel Oblast or Arkhangelsk Oblast, a northern Russian province

Film and television
 Archangel, the code name of Michael Coldsmith Briggs III in the 1980s television series Airwolf
 The Archangel, a 1969 Italian comedy film directed by Giorgio Capitani and starring Vittorio Gassman
 Archangel (1990 film), a 1990 Canadian comedy-drama film directed by Guy Maddin
 Archangel (2005 film), an adaptation of the novel by Robert Harris 
 Archangel, a space warship in the series Mobile Suit Gundam SEED and Mobile Suit Gundam SEED Destiny
 Arch Angels, a 2006 Japanese film based on the manga series Warau Michael
 "Arkangel" (Black Mirror), a season 4 episode

Literature
 Archangel, a 1994 novel by Garry Kilworth
 Archangel, a 1995 novel by Paul Watkins
 Archangel (Shinn novel), a 1997 novel by Sharon Shinn
 Archangel (Harris novel), a 1999 novel by Robert Harris
 Archangel (Gibson comic), a 2017 graphic novel by William Gibson
 Ark Angel, the sixth book in the Alex Rider series by Anthony Horowitz
 Warren Worthington III, a Marvel comic book superhero formerly known as Archangel

Music
 Arcángel (born 1985), Dominican-American raised in Puerto Rico, singer-songwriter, rapper and actor
 Arcángel & De La Ghetto, Reggaeton duo consisting of Austin "Arcángel" Santos and Rafael "De La Ghetto" Castillo
 Archangel (Two Steps from Hell album), a 2011 album by Two Steps From Hell
 Archangel (Soulfly album), a 2015 album and a song by American heavy metal band Soulfly
 "Archangel", a song by Amaranthe from the album Manifest
 "Archangel", a song by The Walker Brothers from the album Portrait
 "Archangel", a song by Burial from the album Untrue
 Arc Angel (band), rock band that was formed by musicians Jeff Cannata and Michael Soldan.
 Arc Angels, a Blues rock supergroup formed in Texas in the early 1990s.

Comics
 Archangel is the highest rank of angel in DC Comics 
 Demiurgic Archangels are Lucifer and Michael, and they are credit on creating Multiverses

Other uses
 Archangel (operation), a British military operation during World War I
 Archangel pigeon, a breed of fancy pigeon
 Archangel (video game), a 2002 action role-playing video game
 Archangel (2017 video game), a 2017 VR game developed by Skydance Interactive
 Arkangel (magazine), a British-based bi-annual animal liberation magazine
 Archangel, a weaponized satellite in the video game Crysis 3
 Archangel, the code name of a series of aircraft designs by Lockheed such as the A-11 and A-12

See also
 Arkangel (disambiguation)
 Estadio Nuevo Arcángel, multi-use stadium in Córdoba, Spain
 Yellow Archangel, the common name of wildflower Lamium galeobdolon, a member of Lamiaceae
 Archangelos (disambiguation)
 Archangelos, Laconia, a village in Laconia
 Archangelos, Rhodes, a town in the island of Rhodes
 Archangelos, Preveza, a village in the regional unit of Preveza
 Archangelos, Pella, a town in the regional unit of Pella